Maryna Oleksandrivna Bekh-Romanchuk (born 18 July 1995) is a Ukrainian long jumper and triple jumper. She won the silver medal at the 2019 World Championships.

Career
She finished fifth at the 2011 World Youth Championships, eighth at the 2012 World Junior Championships, won the bronze medal at the 2013 European Junior Championships and finished ninth at the 2014 World Junior Championships, and fifth at the 2020 Olympic Games in Tokyo. She competed at the 2013 World Championships without reaching the final.

Her personal best jump is 6.93 metres, achieved in Lutsk in 2016.

Competition record

References

External links

1995 births
Living people
Ukrainian female long jumpers
Ukrainian female triple jumpers
Olympic athletes of Ukraine
Athletes (track and field) at the 2016 Summer Olympics
Athletes (track and field) at the 2019 European Games
European Games medalists in athletics
European Games bronze medalists for Ukraine
European Games gold medalists for Ukraine
World Athletics Championships athletes for Ukraine
World Athletics Championships medalists
Ukrainian Athletics Championships winners
Universiade gold medalists in athletics (track and field)
Universiade gold medalists for Ukraine
Medalists at the 2019 Summer Universiade
European Athletics Indoor Championships winners
Athletes (track and field) at the 2020 Summer Olympics
World Athletics Indoor Championships medalists
Sportspeople from Khmelnytskyi Oblast
European Athletics Championships winners
21st-century Ukrainian women